Mashare Chaiyaphum Football Club (Thai สโมสรฟุตบอล มาแชร์ ชัยภูมิ) is a Thai football club based in Chaiyaphum, Thailand. They currently play in Thailand Amateur League Northeastern region.

Honours

Domestic leagues
 Provincial League:
 Runners-up (1): 2008

Domestic cups
 Thailand FA Cup:
 Runners-up (1): 1985

Stadium and locations

Season by season record

The club was docked 20 points in 2011 for fielding an ineligible player

P = Played
W = Games won
D = Games drawn
L = Games lost
F = Goals for
A = Goals against
Pts = Points
Pos = Final position

QR1 = First Qualifying Round
QR2 = Second Qualifying Round
R1 = Round 1
R2 = Round 2
R3 = Round 3
R4 = Round 4

R5 = Round 5
R6 = Round 6
QF = Quarter-finals
SF = Semi-finals
RU = Runners-up
W = Winners

Players

Current squad

References

External links
 Official Website of Chaiyaphum United
 Official Facebookpage

Association football clubs established in 2008
Football clubs in Thailand
Sport in Chaiyaphum province
2008 establishments in Thailand